Urea phosphate is a fertilizer having NPK formula 17-44-0. It is soluble in water, and produces a strongly acidic solution. Urea phosphate is sometimes added to blends which contain calcium nitrate, magnesium nitrate and potassium nitrate to produce water-soluble formulas such as 15-5-15 and 13-2-20. The acidity of urea phosphate allows Ca, Mg and P to co-exist in solution. Under less acidic conditions, there would be precipitation of Ca-Mg phosphates. Urea phosphate is often used in drip irrigation to clean pipe systems.

Chemically, the urea phosphate compound is made of an equimolar mix of urea and phosphoric acid crystallizing together, and freely disassociating when dissolving in water. It is available in fertilizer vendor bags that carry a UP signet on the packaging.

Phosphates
Ureas